The 2006 AMA Superbike Championship is the 31st season of the AMA Superbike Championship

Season Calendar

Superbike Season Calendar

AMA Superbike

Rider Standings

AMA Superstock

Rider Standings

AMA Formula Xtreme

Rider Standings

AMA Supersport

Rider Standings

References

AMA Superbike Championship seasons
Ama Superbike
Ama Superbike